Giulio Oggioni (1916–1993) was an Italian prelate who led the Diocese of Bergamo from 1977 to 1991.

Life
Born in Villasanta, Oggioni was ordained a priest in 1939. In 1972 Pope Paul VI named him Bishop of Lodi, and in 1977 Pope John Paul II named him bishop of Bergamo.
He died on 26 February 1993.

References

External links and additional sources
 (for Chronology of Bishops) 
 (for Chronology of Bishops) 

1916 births
1993 deaths
Bishops of Lodi
Bishops of Bergamo
People from the Province of Milan
20th-century Italian Roman Catholic bishops